The 23rd Quebec Cinema Awards were held on June 6, 2021, to honour achievements in the Cinema of Quebec in 2020. A live gala was hosted by actress Geneviève Schmidt; due to the COVID-19 pandemic in Canada, however, it was staged differently than a traditional award gala, with nominees present in the theatre but seated in a way that maintained social distancing requirements. The awards were initially numbered as the 22nd Quebec Cinema Awards gala, despite being the 23rd time the awards have been presented overall, as the presentation of the 2020 awards was done by livestream instead of a traditional award ceremony; however, the awards in 2022 were numbered as the 24th Quebec Cinema Awards instead of the 23rd, indicating that the 2021 awards are now considered the 23rd.

Additionally, in light of the effects that the pandemic had on film distribution in 2020, the organization did not limit its public-voted Prix Public to the five most commercially successful films of the year, but simply listed all 16 feature films that received commercial theatrical screenings in 2020 as eligible for the vote. Ten days later, they also decided to add all of the eligible documentary films to the Public Prize ballot as well, bringing the total number of nominees in that category to 29.

Nominations were announced on April 26. The most-nominated films were Anaïs Barbeau-Lavalette's Goddess of the Fireflies (La déesse des mouches à feu) and Sophie Dupuis's Underground (Souterrain).

The artisans gala, presenting the awards in craft and technical categories, was held on June 3, 2021. Goddess of the Fireflies won Best Film when winners were announced on June 6.

Nominees and winners

References

Quebec Cinema
2020 in Canadian cinema
2021 in Quebec
23
2020 awards in Canada